Mangar may refer to:

 Mangar (fish), a species of fish native to the Middle East
 Mangar Bani, an archaeological site and hill forest in Faridabad district, Haryana, India
 Mangar people, an ethnic group of Nepal
 Mangar language (Nepal), a Sino-Tibetan language of Nepal
 Mangar language (Nigeria), a variety of the Ron language of Nigeria
 An evil wizard in Bard's Tale (1985), a computer game series
 Mangar International Limited, a manufacturer of patient lifting and handling equipment, founded by David Garman

See also
 Mangar-kunjer-kunja, a deity in the Australian aboriginal mythology of the Aranda people 

Language and nationality disambiguation pages